Pansepta is a genus of moths of the family Xyloryctidae.

Species
The genus includes the following species:

 Pansepta amoerocera Diakonoff, 1954
 Pansepta ereboglauca Meyrick, 1926
 Pansepta hierophanes Meyrick, 1925
 Pansepta languescens Diakonoff, 1954
 Pansepta splendens Diakonoff, 1954
 Pansepta tactica Diakonoff, 1954
 Pansepta teleturga Meyrick, 1915
 Pansepta tunsa Diakonoff, 1954

References

 
Xyloryctidae
Xyloryctidae genera